Pumpkin Café Shop is a chain of café shops located at hospitals, ports, and railway stations in Great Britain. It is a sub-brand owned by the SSP Group, which owns or franchises many other food shop brands such as Caffè Ritazza and Upper Crust. The shops sell food, newspapers and hot and cold drinks. As of 2016, the chain "manages" 126 shops.

References

Catering and food service companies of the United Kingdom
Coffeehouses and cafés in the United Kingdom
Rail catering
SSP Group